Giorgis Tsampourakis (Greek: Γιωργής Τσαμπουράκης; born October 31, 1974) is a Greek actor and producer.

Biography 
Tsampourakis was born on October 31, 1974 in Düsseldorf. The is the son of Ioanni and Irini Tsampouraki, who came from Avgeniki, Heraklion, Crete.

He graduated from the School of Dramatic Art Veaki. In 2001 he made his TV debut in the series Ti simvainei me ton Chari. In 2005 he starred in the series Ston Ilio tou Aigaiou. In 2019 he starred in To Kokkino Potami.

He is married and has two children. He is the owner of the restaurant "ASTER" in Petralona, together with his friend and actor Michalis Moulakakis.

He is the founder and director of the theater company "Imeros" and the Higher School of Dramatic Art "NOTOS" in Heraklion, Crete.

Filmography

Movies

Theatre 
Bend
Alloi antropoi
O Elafovasilias
To aima pou marathike
Oidipodas
Oresteia
Filla apo Giali
Basilias Lir
O thanatos tou Danton
Erotokritos
Perses
Kaligoulas
O Vasilikos
Odysseia
Oi Tris Adelfes
Ena mathima xorou
Mon petit prince 
Fool for love
O Theios Vanya
Nora

References

External links 

1974 births
Living people
Greek male television actors
Greek male film actors
Greek male stage actors
Greek male voice actors
21st-century Greek male actors
Male actors from Crete
People from Heraklion (regional unit)
Actors from Düsseldorf
People from Heraklion